Ramona Härdi (Ramona Haerdi) (born on April 9, 1997 in Möriken, Aargau, Switzerland) is a Swiss speed-skater. She competed for Switzerland at the 2018 Winter Olympics in the ladies' mass start.

Biography
At the age of six, Härdi took up inline skating and switched to speed skating later. She moved to Heerenveen, Netherlands in order for her to train for tournaments.

Career
Härdi started her career in inline skating. In 2012, she participated in the Swiss Skate Tour Final in Geisingen, Germany, where she placed first, She competed at the Swiss Championships in September 2013 and came in third place.

Härdi's first major speed skating events were the 3000m at the Junior World Cup in Baselga di Pinè, Italy, and the 2016 World Junior Championships in Changchun, China. In Italy, she came in fourteenth; in China, she came in fifteenth. The two events helped her overall rank twenty-third in the 2015-16 World Cup season with 45 points, thus qualifying her for the 2018 Winter Olympics.

Härdi competed at the 2018 European Speed Skating Championships in Kolomna, Russia and finished thirteenth.

2018 Winter Olympics
On January 15, 2018, it was announced by the Swiss Olympic team that Härdi would make her Olympic debut at the 2018 Winter Olympics. She and Livio Wenger are the only two Swiss speed skaters at the games. Härdi is the first Swiss skater to compete in the ladies' mass start event since its introduction at the 2018 Winter Olympics.

In Pyeongchang, Härdi competed in the ladies' mass start. In the semi-finals, she did not finish, completing 4/16 laps, at a time of 2:49.59; ranking 12th. She did not qualify for the finals.

References

1997 births
Living people
Speed skaters at the 2018 Winter Olympics
Olympic speed skaters of Switzerland
Swiss female speed skaters
People from Lenzburg District
Sportspeople from Aargau
21st-century Swiss women